Osagyefo Oseadeeyo Agyemang Badu II is a Ghanaian traditional ruler who is the Omanhene (or paramount chief) of the Dormaa traditional area (Dormaaman) in Ghana. He is the President of the Bono Regional house of chiefs.

References 

Ghanaian royalty
Ghanaian leaders
Year of birth missing (living people)
Living people